The 1973 World Table Tennis Championships men's doubles was the 32nd edition of the men's doubles championship.
Stellan Bengtsson and Kjell Johansson won the title after defeating István Jónyer and Tibor Klampár in the final by three sets to two.

Results

See also
List of World Table Tennis Championships medalists

References

-